Preah Peay Phat is a 1971 Khmer film directed by Ly You Sreang starring Kong Som Eun and Vichara Dany.

Plot 
A peasant, Chivon, played by Kong Som Eun, falls in love with the daughter of a wealthy man, "Preah Peay Phat", Vichara Dany. Chivon does everything he can in order to get his lovers attention but they are forbidden to see each other. When the peasant falls in love with another woman, Preah Peay Phat is heartbroken. That is when the terrible news is revealed, Preah Peay Phat and Chivon are brothers and sisters.

Cast 
Kong Som Eun
Vichara Dany
Phoung Phavy

Soundtrack

References 
 

1971 films
Cambodian drama films